7 Paoni - Coptic calendar - 9 Paoni

Fixed commemorations
All fixed commemorations below are observed on 8 Paoni (15 June) by the Coptic Orthodox Church.

Saints
Martyrdom of Saint Tamada and her children, and Saint Armenius and his mother.
Martyrdom of Saint Georges the New Martyr (1103 A.M.), (1387 A.D.).

Commemorations
Commemoration of the consecration of the Church of the Virgin Mary at Mostorod (901 A.M.), (1185 A.D.).

References
Coptic Synexarion

Days of the Coptic calendar